Budhlada is a municipal council located in the Mansa district of the state of Punjab, India. The area's main industry is agriculture, which provides the majority of employment opportunities in the region. The municipal council of Budhlada is divided into 19 wards, and regular elections are held every five years. It has held the status of a Class II Municipal Council since the 1950s.

History

Budha and Ladha were two real brothers who were khatri by caste. The village has got its name from the name of these two brothers. Some of the population of the village was of Majhbi and Ramdasia. Once a part of the state of Kaithal, it was punitively annexed along with the rest of that territory after not helping the British during the insurgency of 1857. The village later merged with Karnal District, one of the largest markets in East Punjab. The area was said to be a good area for the recruitment of military personnel, second only to Rohtak. Hawaldar Joginder Singh Datewas, a soldier recruited from Budhlada, was notably awarded the Ashoka Chakra.

The British built a railway line that connected Budhlada to other parts of Punjab, which led to increased trade and commerce in the region. In 1901, the population of Budhlada was around 3,500. In the 1930s and 1940s, it  was popular for its 'boora khand' (superfine sugar). A large factory was located near the railway station, with consignments sent to Lahore and Karachi. This period of relative prosperity ended when it was cut off from those markets by the Partition of India in 1947.

As per current estimate in 2021, the total population of the city is approximately 35,000.

Under the British Raj, Budhlada was a "riyasat" (princely state), home to a police station prior to independence. Lok Nike (Hero of People) Jiauna Maur's brother Kishna Maur was arrested by Budhlada police station. Both brothers were well-known for helping poor people. Sucha Singh Soorma's village Samauo is almost  from Budhlada but it remained neglected after India gained independence. The martyr Capt. K. K. Gaur, social reformer Babu Hitabhilashi, and scientist Dr. M. L. Singla, who headed the Chandrayaan programme, are also from Budhlada.

Budhlada is also an important centre of the Praja movement. Freedom fighters used Budhlada for many Praja movements in the present Bathinda district. The local people started participating in the Praja Movement after the death of Sewa Singh Thikriwala (president of Riyasat Praja Mandal party).

Demographics 
As of the 2011 Indian census, the total population of Budhlada was 26,172. There were 13,832 males in the city (53%) and 12,340 females (47%). For every 1,000 men in Budhlada, there were 892 women. Furthermore, there were 2,882 children below six years of age, of which 1,599 were boys and 1,283 were girls. 11% of the total population was under six years of age. The number of working individuals in Budhlada was 8,726, with the remaining 17,446 unemployed. Out of 26,172 people, 18,680 people were literate. Budhlada has a literacy rate of 80.2%, higher than the national literacy rate of 74.0%. Sikhism and Hinduism are the major religions practiced in Budhlada, making up about 98% of the population.

Geography and climate 

Transport

Road
The city is located on the major roads SH-21 and NH-148B.

Railways
The railway station of the city was established in 1895 under the Southern Punjab Railway. It is now situated on the Delhi-Ferozpur main railway line of Northern Railway and is connected with other major cities in India, including Delhi, Mumbai, Guwahati, and Kolkata.

Air
The nearest airports to the city are Bathinda Airport (86 km) and Patiala Airport (89 km). The nearest International Airport is Chandigarh Airport (170 km).

Places of interest

A popular Gurudwara Braham Bunga is located in Dodra,  from Budhlada. Every year, three main  (Gathering place) are held at Dodra in the months of March, September, and December. Sangat from all over the world comes over during these  events to take . The city is connected by rail and road to the cities Punjab and Haryana. Budhlada may not have as many tourist attractions as some of the other cities in Punjab, it does offer a few interesting places to visit which include Krishna Mandir, Shiva Mandir, Hanuman Mandir, Gurudwara Shri Guru Teg Bahadur Sahib, Guru Nanak College, YLS Academy of Education, Jagat Resorts, Pool Centre, New Judicial Court complex, ITI Stadium and Bharati Palace, Ram Bagh (park).

Education
The city has several schools that offer primary, secondary, and higher secondary education. Some of the most prominent government schools in the town include the Captain KK Gaur Girls School and Government Boys Senior Secondary School. There are some private institutes in the city for engineering and medical entrance examinations. National Institute of Computer Education and the ITI (Industrial Training Institute) offer technical education to the students. There is one government-funded college as well.The leading educational institutions of the area are Guru Nanak College, LADM DAV Public School, and Manu Vatika Day Boarding School.

References

Cities and towns in Mansa district, India